Zgornje Hlapje is a dispersed settlement in the Slovene Hills in northeastern Slovenia. It belongs to the Municipality of Pesnica, traditionally part of Styria. The area is now included in the Drava Statistical Region.

References

External links
Zgornje Hlapje on Geopedia

Populated places in the Municipality of Pesnica